Karen Rebecca Nordgren (born May 25, 1961) is an American politician who has served in the Alabama House of Representatives from the 29th district since 2010.

References

1961 births
Living people
Republican Party members of the Alabama House of Representatives
21st-century American politicians